Orphans of Happiness or Shadow Children of Happiness is a 1922 German silent film directed by Franz Osten and starring Vilma Bánky.

It was made at the Emelka Studios in Munich.

Cast
In alphabetical order
Vilma Bánky

Carl Goetz
Ila Lóth
Ferdinand Martini

References

Bibliography

External links

1922 films
Films of the Weimar Republic
Films directed by Franz Osten
German silent feature films
German black-and-white films
Films shot at Bavaria Studios
Bavaria Film films